He-Man has been considered a gay icon by the early 2000s. A fictional superhero of the sword and sorcery Masters of the Universe media franchise created by Mattel, and his first appearance was in minicomics packaged with his toy figures. He-Man received his own television series titled He-Man and the Masters of the Universe, which aired for 130 episodes from 1983 to 1985; the series established traits of the character that would remain consistent in future installments of the franchise. He-Man is the alter ego of Prince Adam, who hails from the realm of Eternia and is its defender who, alongside his friends, protects it and the secrets of Castle Grayskull from the evil forces of Skeletor.

He-Man has been singled out for the homoeroticism and gay subtext surrounding his character. Despite the original series having aired during the presidency of Ronald Reagan, many individuals and publications have noted that since his inception, He-Man's character has contained elements of queer coding. Discussions have focused on his adherence to various gay stereotypes regarding his physical appearance, which relates to LGBT subcultures such as the "gay clone" culture. Attention has also been afforded to his double life being reminiscent of closeted gay men, and his perceived homosexuality. Concerning his sexual orientation, He-Man's relationships with other male characters, such as Man-at-Arms, have also been highlighted.

Since his creation, He-Man has become a gay icon and amassed an LGBT following, specifically amongst gay men. The character has also been noted for his sex appeal to gay men, something which made many of them become aware of their sexuality. The queer reading of He-Man's character, particularly his relationship with Skeletor, has been referenced in other media, including in advertisements and to raise money for charity. According to various insiders and employees, Mattel is aware of and receptive to He-Man's gay icon status, his following in the LGBT community, and the perception of the character as a gay man.

Background
He-Man is the protagonist of the Masters of the Universe toy line, created by Mattel, with his first appearance being in minicomics packed with the toys. The cartoon series He-Man and the Masters of the Universe, based on Mattel's toyline, first aired in September 1983 and would go on to air 130 episodes, concluding its run in 1985. The series established He-Man as the alter ego of Prince Adam of Eternia, who is the son of King Randor and Queen Marlena.

When Adam uttered the phrase, "By the power of Grayskull, I have the power", he would transform into He-Man, the strongest man in the universe, and gain a variety of abilities; the phrase also allowed his feline companion Cringer to simultaneously transform into Battle Cat. The only other people aware of his secret identity were Orko, Duncan / Man-At-Arms, and the Sorceress of Castle Grayskull who gave Adam his powers. He-Man and the Heroic Warriors battle against the forces of the evil Skeletor and strive to protect the secrets of Castle Grayskull from his clutches.

Homosexual reading and analyses
The original series aired during the presidency of Ronald Reagan (1981–1989), which Jake Pitre acknowledges as a period where producers attempted to "defuse any possible queer readings" of their cartoons. Regarding this, Anthony Gramuglia of Comic Book Resources stated that because censors often prevented  explicit representation of LGBT characters, creators often had to rely on queer coding, giving characters camp qualities to implicitly indicate their LGBT status.

According to author and professor Jeffery P. Dennis, cartoons are "unusually amenable to subtexts that hint at or even celebrate same-sex desire", and "often produce a tacit validation of same-sex romantic or domestic relationships, even when the animators have no such interest". Regarding this, Dennis notes even in cartoons that lack a same-sex pairing, it is still possible to see a queer sexual identity being applied to a character; something that occurred with He-Man, who "was muscular and never dated girls". Professor and author Jes Battis also said the series "dealt in themes of queerness and secrecy", while Syfy writer Jordan Zakarin described the original cartoon as "the gayest show that has ever been on TV".

Michael G. Cornelius proclaimed that homoeroticism is prevalent not only in Masters of the Universe, but many other sword-and-sandal franchises as well. He has discussed how He-Man's muscular body was the focal point that dominated every aspect of the franchise, and was highly objectified. Regarding the fascination with the male physique and attention given to He-Man's body in the franchise, Cornelius describes this as reminiscent of the Castro clones and gay clone culture that prevailed in the United States around the same period the original cartoon aired. Gay clone culture was characterized by a butch and masculine look, a muscular physique, and wearing clothing similar to that of a blue-collar worker, and Cornelius highlights how both the He-Man franchise and gay clone culture "fetishized […] the male form".

In the world of Masters of the Universe, the body is "text, to be read as key signifier in the fashioning of male identity". Within gay clone culture, the male body is viewed both as "object of desire and object of subjective fashioning", with said culture requiring an impressive musculature to "manoeuvre successfully". Cornelius further notes that while He-Man likely was not created to reflect this aspect of gay clone culture, both display similar social anxieties and desires regarding the male body that differ from the "larger heteronormative continuum present in society at the time".

Queer-coded nature and gay subtext

Appearance and outfits

Given the time period of the show's original airing, it is believed its gay subtext was either unintentional or the result of queer coding. Many aspects of Prince Adam's and He-Man's outfits conform to gay stereotypes, with Cornelius proclaiming that He-Man’s “clothing and physique are designed to relay a message that otherwise can not be sent”. David Chlopecki describes Prince Adam as a "very gay guy", highlighting him wearing lavender, pink, and white spandex, as well as his "blond pageboy haircut". Slate magazine's Sam Anderson—who described the original series as containing "accidental homo-eroticism"—also singled out Adam's clothing, particularly his "lavender stretch pants, furry purple Ugg boots, and a sleeveless pink blouse".

Regarding the character's appearance after transforming, NPR described He-Man's outfit as adding to the show's homoerotic subtext, given its resemblance to those of leather subculture. Specifically, He-Man wearing a bondage harness has often been singled out, given that in the 1980s it was considered to be homoerotic imagery. Relating this, Cornelius notes how the Village People modelled their outfits after the gay clone culture of New York and argues that He-Man, with his “leather strapping and ‘furry underwear’ would have blended right in”. Chlopecki further argues that He-Man's and Skeletor's bodies are representative of the AIDS epidemic that devastated the LGBT community at the time of the show's production; such as Skeletor's face resembling the facial wasting of gay men succumbing to HIV/AIDS.

Attention has also been paid to Adam's transformation into He-Man through his phallic sword and "fabulous powers". Adam's transformation into He-Man in Masters of the Universe: Revelation (2021–present) has been compared to those of magical girls like Sailor Moon / Usagi Tsukino, from the anime television series Sailor Moon. Sailor Moon has often been highlighted as a "landmark anime for LGBTQIA+ representation".

Character and personality
The character's double life has also been noted as queer subtext, with The Guardian acknowledging that the character became "renowned within the LGBTQ+ community" because they "saw parallels" in the secret life of Prince Adam. According to Battis, Adam's need to "hide his true identity as [He-Man]" is one of the show's key queer aspects. Highsnobietys Sophia Atkinson noted his double life as Prince Adam and He-Man reflects the "difficulties of living as a gay man", and that across various media in the franchise, He-Man never shows romantic interest in women.

British newspaper The Daily Telegraph said the character's dual identity represents a man's struggle to accept his sexuality; Prince Adam is closeted and has a secret while He-Man is "out-and-proud". Writing for The Johns Hopkins News-Letter, Matt Johnson described the series' depiction of He-Man as a "thinly veiled treatise on the state of gay male sexuality in the eighties". Johnson views He-Man as a sexually repressed, closeted gay man whose transformation from Adam into He-Man represents his pent-up frustrations reaching their peak and needing to being released.

Skeletor's obsession with He-Man has invited homoerotic interpretations. Furthermore, He-Man's relationship with Man-At-Arms, one of the few characters aware of his secret identity, has also been acknowledged as being homoerotic. Men's Health has noted how He-Man's relationship with both of these men contains a "will-they-or-won’t-they tension".

Gay icon and fandom
He-Man's homoeroticism and implied homosexuality resulted in the character and show drawing a queer audience when the cartoon first aired, with the character being now viewed as a gay icon. Wired magazine's Lorenzo Fantoni, highlights that He-Man is a "muscular blonde who fights with hairy men and equally muscular enemies", described his arguing that the character becoming a gay icon as having been inevitable. Author and professor Jarrett Neal described the original cartoon as having featured such "blatant homoerotic imagery [that] Mattel can [receive] credit for captivating an entire generation of gay men". Neal also stated that he identified with Prince Adam and wished to attain the "physicality and confidence of He-Man". The Guardian also acknowledges that members of the LGBT community identified with the character and leading a secret life.

Men's Health said gay men were one of the three core groups that were consumers of He-Man toys. ND Stevenson, the creator, showrunner, and executive producer of She-Ra and the Princesses of Power (2018–20) has also stated He-Man—alongside She-Ra—is a gay icon, and the character's LGBT fanbase has been credited as helping provide support for the inclusion of openly queer characters in the She-Ra reboot.

Sex appeal
When development on a live-action remake of the film was first-announced, LGBT lifestyle magazine Out also described the original series as "one of the gayest ... cartoons of all time", and said the 1987 film "turn[ed] an entire generation of boys at least a little gay". Instinct magazine's Gerald Biggerstaff described the original cartoon as being quite popular with gay men who grew up in the 1980s and 90s, and that for many of them, He-Man "prompted [their] gay awakenings". In 2003, HX Magazine editors compiled a list of must-see television series with attractive male leads, with He-Man as himself and based on his appearance in the 2002 reboot—the only animated character to make the list—being described as the "object of all our childhood wet dreams". British magazine Gay Times compiled a list of cartoon characters their editors were attracted to while growing up; He-Man was at the top of the list, taking note of Dolph Lundgren's depiction of him in the live-action film. In the same publication, actor Andrew Hayden-Smith said in 2016 he realized he was gay while playing with his He-Man figure as a child, being attracted to the character's physique—particularly his pecs.

Queer reading in other media

In Dan Fishback's Thirtynothing (2011), a play focusing on gay artists who had died and the AIDS crisis, Fishback discusses watching the cartoon in his childhood and the show's opening credits are included. The credits are followed by footage of a 1989 ACT UP protest at the Food and Drug Administration (FDA) headquarters, where activists demanded an "accelerated approval process for HIV treatments". Jayson A. Morrison discusses how in doing so, Fishback connects Prince Adam's transformation into the powerful He-Man by holding up a sword and reciting a phrase to LGBT individuals "who [gain] extraordinary powers as activists".

In April 2011, David Mason, Brian Moylan, and fashion writer and artist Bradford Shellhammer held the "Skeletor Saves" charity art-auction event, the proceeds of which went to the Ali Forney Center; an LGBT community center helping homeless LGBT youth. The event was inspired by Mason's childhood love for the He-Man franchise and Skeletor was one of his personal heroes, and attracted the attention of fashion designers Helmut Lang and Marc Jacobs. Writing for Canadian LGBT-focused Xtra Magazine, Helen Whithead stated the art show allowed artists to "explore the sexy, camp side of the homoerotic He-Man muscle fest". Many of the works submitted to the event included portrayals of He-Man in LGBT and NSFW situations, including depictions of Skeletor seducing him and depicting the two characters having sex.

In 2017, British company Moneysupermarket.com  used the gay reading of He-Man's character and his relationship with Skeletor in an  advertisement that shows the characters embracing and dancing, which Joe Glass of Bleeding Cool described as "on the homoerotic side". Following the release of Brokeback Mountain in 2005, which focuses on the emotional and sexual relationship between two cowboys, multiple parodies of the film's trailer were created and uploaded on YouTube. According to Jennifer Malkowski, these fake trailers tend to "amplif[y] queer subtext" found within works, with one such video titled "Brokeback Snake Mountain" focusing on the romance between He-Man and Man-at-Arms.

Response from Mattel and insiders
According to Erika Scheimer, the franchise's voice actor and openly-lesbian daughter of Filmation co-founder Lou Scheimer, the company welcomed gay artists, and many members of the studio "long[ed] to see themselves onscreen" and joked He-Man is gay. According to Mark Morse, Mattel's director of global marketing from 2008 to 2017, by 2018, when a "Laughing Prince Adam" action figure was released, the question of He-Man's sexuality and whether a future installment in the franchise should have him be openly gay had not been discussed. Morse stated Mattel wanted to ensure the figure would not be viewed as offensive to the LGBT+ community.

In an interview with gay lifestyle online magazine Queerty, Rob David and Tim Sheridan, who work on the Masters of the Universe: Revelation, discussed the character's homoeroticism and gay fanbase. Sheridan, a gay man who is one of the show's writers, believes He-Man fostered a gay fanbase despite not being openly gay because of the original show's themes. He also said He-Man is coded in such a way in Revelation his character can be interpreted in numerous ways, which Sheridan believes can bring people together. According to David, who is an executive producer of Revelation and Mattel's Vice President of Creative Content, Mattel is "very comfortable" with He-Man's gay audience and the perception of the character as a gay man.

Notes

References

Bibliography

Further reading
 

Gay icon
Masters of the Universe